Davide Corso (born 29 April 1992) is an Italian footballer who plays as a midfielder for Serie D club Locri.

Club career

Catanzaro
Corso played his first game for Catanzaro on 4 September 2011 in a 0-0 away draw against Melfi.

Matera
In August 2018, he joined Serie C club Matera.

Serie D
On 5 August 2019, he signed with Corigliano in Serie D. However, he left the club again after two months. On 11 December 2019, he then joined Gelbison Cilento. In July 2020, he moved to Cittanova. Two years later, in July 2022, he joined AC Locri 1909.

References

External links

1992 births
Sportspeople from Messina
Living people
Italian footballers
Association football defenders
U.S. Catanzaro 1929 players
Reggina 1914 players
Taranto F.C. 1927 players
Matera Calcio players
Serie C players
Serie D players
Footballers from Sicily